Raisa Minakhmedovna Atambayeva (Russian: Раиса Минахмедовна Атамбаева; born 25 June 1958) is the wife of the former President of Kyrgyzstan Almazbek Atambayev and First Lady of Kyrgyzstan from 2011 to 2017. She is an ethnic Tatar and was born in the Tatar Autonomous Soviet Socialist Republic. She is a doctor.

Early life and career 
She was born on 25 June 1958 in the Urals of the Russian SFSR. During the Soviet era, she moved with her parents to Osh, Kyrgyz SSR. Here she graduated from the secondary school named after Lomonosov, where she learned English and Kyrgyz. Atambaeva is a candidate of medical sciences.

Personal life 

She is married to Almazbek Atambayev. She has 2 children with Atambayev, a boy Khadyrbek and a girl Aliya.

References 

Living people
1956 births
First ladies and gentlemen of Kyrgyzstan
Kyrgyzstani physicians
21st-century Kyrgyzstani women politicians
21st-century Kyrgyzstani politicians
Tatar people
Kyrgyzstani people of Tatar descent
Russian emigrants to Kyrgyzstan